The city of New Bedford, Massachusetts once had about 70 textile mills, operated by 28 establishments with over 3.7 million spindles at its peak around 1920, and was among the leading cotton textile centers in the United States during the early 20th century.  There are currently about 18 mills left in the city.

Existing mills

Non-extant mills

See also
List of mills in Fall River, Massachusetts
List of mills in Holyoke, Massachusetts
List of mills in Oldham

References

History of Massachusetts
New Bedford
Mills New Bedford